A list of the high school conferences in New York state:

Conference Name: #-C

O-R

probably not comprehensive, but a good start
AAIS
Catholic A Central
Catholic A North
Catholic A South
Catholic Bklyn/Queens
Catholic New York
Catholic B
Catholic Nassau/Suffolk
Catholic Staten Island
Harvard Cup
 
Monsignor Martin - Class A
Monsignor Martin - Class AA
Section 1 Conference 1A
Section 1 Conference 1B
Section 1 Conference 1C
Section 1 Conference 1D
Section 1 Conference 2A
Section 1 Conference 2B
Section 1 Conference 2C
Section 1 Conference 2D
Section 1 Conference 2E
Section 1 Conference 3A
Section 1 Conference 3B
Section 1 Conference 3C
Section 1 Conference 3D
Section 1 Conference 4A
Section 1 Conference 4B
Section 1 Conference 4C
Section 1 Conference 4D
Section 2 Adirondack - East
Section 2 Adirondack - West
Section 2 Big Ten
Section 2 Central Hudson Valley
Section 2 Colonial
Section 2 Foothills
Section 2 Freelance
Section 2 Patroon
Section 2 Suburban - Blue
Section 2 Suburban - Gold
Section 2 Suburban - White
Section 2 Wasaren
Section 2 Western - Northern
Section 2 Western - Southern
Section 3 Center State I
Section 3 Center State II
Section 3 Center State III
Section 3 Center State IV
Section 3 Central Counties
Section 3 Colonial
Section 3 Freedom
Section 3 Freelance
Section 3 Frontier A
Section 3 Frontier B
Section 3 Frontier D
Section 3 Liberty
Section 3 Patriot
Section 3 Tri-Valley
Section 4 Delaware County - Delaware Mountain
Section 4 Delaware County - Upper Delaware
Section 4 Freelance
Section 4 Interscholastic - North Large
Section 4 Interscholastic - North Small
Section 4 Interscholastic - South Large
Section 4 Interscholastic - South Small
Section 4 Midstate
Section 4 NY-Penn Christian
Section 4 Southern Tier - Central
Section 4 Southern Tier - East
Section 4 Southern Tier - Metro
Section 4 Southern Tier - West
Section 4 Tri-Valley - East
Section 4 Tri-Valley - West
Section 5 Allegany County Division 1
Section 5 Allegany County Division 2
Section 5 Finger Lakes - East
Section 5 Finger Lakes - West
Section 5 Freelance
Section 5 Genesee County
Section 5 Livingston County I
Section 5 Livingston County II
Section 5 Livingston County III
Section 5 Monroe County I - East
Section 5 Monroe County I - West
Section 5 Monroe County II - East
Section 5 Monroe County II - West
Section 5 Private Parochial
Section 5 Rochester City Catholic
Section 5 Steuben County
Section 5 Wayne County
Section 6 Buffalo I
Section 6 Buffalo II
Section 6 Chautauqua-Cattaraugus Athletic Association 1 East
Section 6 Chautauqua-Cattaraugus Athletic Association 1 West
Section 6 Chautauqua-Cattaraugus Athletic Association 2 East
Section 6 Chautauqua-Cattaraugus Athletic Association 2 West
Section 6 Erie County I
Section 6 Erie County II
Section 6 Erie County III
Section 6 Erie County IV
Section 6 Freelance
Section 6 Niagara - Frontier
Section 6 Niagara - Orleans
Section 7 Champlain Valley I
Section 7 Champlain Valley II
Section 7 Freelance
Section 7 Mountain Valley
Section 8 AA-1
Section 8 AA-2
Section 8 AA-3
Section 8 ABC-1
Section 8 ABC-2
Section 8 ABC-3
Section 8 ABC-4
Section 8 BC
Section 8 Charter
Section 8 Freelance
Section 9 Freelance
Section 9 Mid Hudson I
Section 9 Mid Hudson II
Section 9 Mid Hudson III
Section 9 Mid Hudson IV
Section 9 Orange County I
Section 9 Orange County II
Section 9 Orange County III
Section 9 Orange County IV
Section 9 Orange County V
Section 9 Orange County VI
Section 10 Central
Section 10 East 
Section 10 North
Section 10 West
Section 11 AA-1
Section 11 AA-2
Section 11 AA-3
Section 11 AA-4
Section 11 AA/A-5
Section 11 A-6
Section 11 B/C-7
Section 11 C/D-8
Section 11 Freelance
PSAL Area Freelance
PSAL Area Independent Private Parochial
PSAL Area Independent Schools I
PSAL Area Independent Schools II
Ivy Prep League
PSAL Area Metro
PSAL Area Private School
PSAL Bronx A East
PSAL Bronx A West
PSAL Bronx AA
PSAL Bronx B West
PSAL Bronx B1 East
PSAL Bronx B2 East
PSAL Brooklyn A East
PSAL Brooklyn A South
PSAL Brooklyn A West
PSAL Brooklyn AA
PSAL Brooklyn B East
PSAL Brooklyn B West
PSAL Manhattan A East
PSAL Manhattan A Northwest
PSAL Manhattan A Southwest
PSAL Manhattan AA
PSAL Manhattan B-1
PSAL Manhattan B-2
PSAL Manhattan B-3
PSAL Queens A East
PSAL Queens A West
PSAL Queens AA
PSAL Queens B East
PSAL Queens B West
PSAL Staten Island A
Independent
Independent I
Independent II
Unassigned

See also
New York state high school boys basketball championships
Catholic High School Athletic Association

References

External links 
  CHSAA Website

State high school league conferences
High school sports associations in New York (state)
High school sports conferences and leagues in the United States
 
High school conferences
Secondary education-related lists